Noblejas is a municipality of Spain located in the province of Toledo, Castilla–La Mancha. The municipality spans across a total area of 69.67 km2 and, as of 1 January 2021, it has a registered population of 3,721.
Radio Exterior (the Spanish state's international shortwave station) has transmitter its 0.5 km (500 yards) south of Noblejas. It belongs to the traditional comarca of Mesa de Ocaña.

History 
In 1149 it was reported to be a hamlet belonging to Aurelia (Oreja). By 1224, it was reported as a populated place attached to the Order of Santiago. It was already a town by the early 15th century.

References
Citations

Bibliography
 

Municipalities in the Province of Toledo